Bring 'Em In is the debut album of the Swedish band Mando Diao, released 2002 in Sweden. In 2003 the album was released as both a CD and an LP internationally, and was well received by critics.

The Japan release of the album adds three bonus tracks, shuffled amongst the original track listing. In 2005, a limited edition of the album was released, adding a second disc of B-sides and demos.

Singles and EP releases

The album spawned several singles in Sweden, "Motown Blood", "Mr Moon", "The Band", "Sheepdog" and "Paralyzed." Internationally, "Sheepdog" and "Paralyzed" were selected as the only singles.

"Motown Blood EP", was released in 2002 in Sweden by EMI Music Sweden as the first release from the band Mando Diao. The title track, "Little Boy Jr" and "Lady" all later appeared on the band's first album, Bring 'Em In, while "A Picture Of Them All" was only included on the Japanese version of the album, as a B-side on the Swedish "Paralyzed" EP and on the B-side compilation "The Malevolence of Mando Diao 2002-2007".

"Mr Moon" was the debut single of the band and reached #37 on Swedish charts.

The song "The Band" is about a fight between the band's two singers. It was written when singer/songwriter Gustaf Norén wanted to leave the band and move away from their hometown of Borlänge, Sweden. Björn Dixgård, the band's other singer/songwriter, wrote the chorus of the song to Norén after their fight to reveal his side of the argument. Norén returned to the band after hearing Dixgård's song. The band reconciled, and Norén wrote the verses to the song. The Band was released as a single in 2002. The B-Side, "Driving Around" was also released later on the Swedish "Paralyzed" EP and the Japanese single "Sheepdog".

The third single "Sheepdog" failed to chart in Europe upon its initial release. The single was released in Japan as an EP with enhanced content. In 2004 the single was released as a 7" in the UK. Its B-side "How We Walk" was also released on the "Paralyzed EP"in Sweden and the US.

"Paralyzed EP" was the released as third EP and was altogether the fifth release from the album. The title track was taken from the album and the B-sides were all taken from earlier singles from 2002. The US version released by Mute features three live tracks as an added bonus, while dropping two of the original B-sides. The version of the EP downloadable through the US iTunes Store retains the Swedish track list. The UK version, bizarrely, dropped all the B-sides and replaced them with two tracks from Bring 'Em In.

Track listing
Regular edition
 "Sheepdog" 3:35
 "Sweet Ride" 2:03
 "Motown Blood" 2:02 
 "Mr. Moon" 3:29
 "The Band" 3:19
 "To China with Love" 5:02
 "Paralyzed" 4:09
 "P.U.S.A." 2:38
 "Little Boy Jr" 2:55
 "Lady" 2:32
 "Bring 'em In" 2:13
 "Lauren's Cathedral" 4:01
Japanese version
 "Chi Ga" (The Band B-Side)Between "P.U.S.A." and "Little Boy Jr"
 "A Picture of 'Em All" (Motown Blood EP B-Side])
 "She's So" (B-Side)Between "Lady" and "Bring 'Em In"

Limited edition bonus disc
 "A Picture Of 'Em All" (Motown Blood EP B-Side)
 "She's So" (B-Side)
 "Chi Ga" (The Band B-Side)
 "Driving Around" (The Band B-Side)
 "And I Don't Know" (Sheepdog B-Side)
 "How We Walk" (Sheepdog B-Side)
 "Sheepdog (Acoustic)" (Sheepdog B-Side)
 "Little Boy Jr (Live) (B-Side)
 "P.U.S.A." (Alternate Version)
 "Sweet Ride" (Demo)
 "Mr. Moon" (Demo)
 "The Band" (Demo)
 "Next to Be Lowered" (Demo)
 "Deadlock" (Previously Unreleased)
 "Lauren's Cathedral" (Demo)
 "Sadly Sweet Mary" (Previously Unreleased)
 "Suffer Pain And Pity" (Previously Unreleased)
 "Major Baby" (Previously Unreleased)
 "White Wall" (Demo)

All songs by Björn Dixgård and Gustaf Norén.

2002 debut albums
Mando Diao albums
EMI Records albums
Mute Records albums